Cheb District is a district in the Karlovy Vary Region of the Czech Republic. Its capital is the town of Cheb. It is the westernmost district of the Czech Republic.

Administrative division
Cheb District is divided into three administrative districts of municipalities with extended competence: Cheb, Aš and Mariánské Lázně.

List of municipalities
Towns are marked in bold:

Aš - 
Cheb -
Dolní Žandov - 
Drmoul - 
Františkovy Lázně - 
Hazlov - 
Hranice - 
Krásná - 
Křižovatka - 
Lázně Kynžvart - 
Libá - 
Lipová - 
Luby - 
Mariánské Lázně - 
Milhostov - 
Milíkov - 
Mnichov - 
Nebanice - 
Nový Kostel - 
Odrava - 
Okrouhlá - 
Ovesné Kladruby - 
Plesná - 
Podhradí - 
Pomezí nad Ohří - 
Poustka - 
Prameny - 
Skalná - 
Stará Voda - 
Teplá - 
Třebeň - 
Tři Sekery - 
Trstěnice - 
Tuřany - 
Valy - 
Velká Hleďsebe - 
Velký Luh - 
Vlkovice - 
Vojtanov - 
Zádub-Závišín

Geography

Cheb District borders Germany in the west. It includes the Aš Panhandle area, which makes it the westernmost district of the Czech Republic. The relief is very varied and includes both flat plains and hilly areas with relatively high altitudes. The territory extends into seven geomorphological mesoregions: Cheb Basin (centre), Fichtel Mountains (west), Upper Palatine Forest (southwest), Upper Palatine Forest Foothills (south), Teplá Highlands (east), Slavkov Forest (northeast) and Ore Mountains (small part in the north).

The most important river is the Ohře, which flows across the district from west to east. Its longest tributary in the area are the rivers Plesná and Teplá. The rivers White Elster and Wondreb spring here and head to Germany. The Röslau briefly forms the Czech-German border before its confluence with the Ohře. The largest bodies of water are two reservoirs: Jesenice, built on the Wondreb, and Skalka, built on the Ohře.

There is one protected landscape area, located in the east of the district: Slavkovský les.

Demographics

Most populated municipalities

Economy
The largest employers with its headquarters in Cheb District and at least 500 employers are:

Transport
The D6 motorway from Prague to Karlovy Vary and Cheb (part of the European routes E48 and E49) forks and continues to the Czech-German border to the west (as E48) and to the north (as E49).

Sights

The town centres of Mariánské Lázně and Františkovy Lázně with the spa cultural landscapes were designated a UNESCO World Heritage Site in 2021 as part of the transnational Great Spa Towns of Europe because of its springs and architectural testimony to the popularity of spa towns in Europe during the 18th through 20th centuries.

The most important monuments in the district, protected as national cultural monuments, are:
Kynžvart Castle
Kynžvart Daguerreotype
Teplá Abbey
Spa colonnade in Mariánské Lázně
Artificial water channel Dlouhá stoka (partly)
Cheb Castle

The best-preserved settlements and landscapes, protected as monument reservations and monument zones, are:

Cheb (monument reservation)
Františkovy Lázně (monument reservation)
Mariánské Lázně (monument reservation)
Doubrava (monument reservation)
Nový Drahov (monument reservation)
Teplá
Beranov
Dolní Lažany
Popovice
Salajna
Landscape around Kladská

The most visited tourist destinations are the Boheminium miniature park in Mariánské Lázně, Soos national nature reserve in Skalná, Cheb Castle, and Kynžvart Castle.

References

External links

Cheb District profile on the Czech Statistical Office's website

 
Districts of the Czech Republic